The Manitoba Court of Appeal is the court of appeal in, and the highest court of, the Canadian province of Manitoba. It hears criminal, civil, and family law cases, as well as appeals from various administrative boards and tribunals.

Seated in Winnipeg, the Court is headed by the Chief Justice of Manitoba, and is composed of a total of 13 justices. At any given time, there may be one or more additional justices who sit as supernumerary justices.

The Court hears appeals from the Provincial Court and the Manitoba Court of King's Bench, as well as certain administrative tribunals, including the Residential Tenancies Commission, the Municipal Board, and the Manitoba Labour Board, among others.

Most cases are heard by a panel of three justices. A single justice presides over matters heard in "chambers", usually interlocutory matters or applications for leave to appeal. Proceedings before the court are governed by the Court of Appeal Rules.

Judges 
Pursuant to The Court of Appeal Act, the Court consists of a Chief Justice and 12 other judges, all of whom are federally-appointed pursuant to the Judges Act.

As a "Superior Court" under section 96 of the federal Constitution Act, 1867, Court of Appeal judges are appointed by the Governor-General of Canada (in practical terms, the Prime Minister of Canada). Appointees must be members of the Manitoba bar, but need not have had previous experience as a judge. However, appointees almost always have some experience as a judge, usually on the Manitoba Court of King's Bench.

Under the Judges Act, federally-appointed judges (such as those on the Manitoba Court of Appeal) may—after being in judicial office for at least 15 years and whose combined age and number of years of judicial service is not less than 80 or after the age of 70 years and at least 10 years judicial service—elect to give up their regular judicial duties and hold office as a supernumerary judge.

The first female appointed to the Court was Bonnie M. Helper, on 30 June 1989. The sons of two former Court of Appeal justices (Samuel Freedman and Alfred Monnin) currently or have recently served as judges on the court (Martin Freedman, Michel Monnin, and Marc Monnin).

Current justices

Past justices

Chief Justice of Manitoba

The Chief Justice of Manitoba heads the Manitoba Court of Appeal. The Chief Justice is responsible for the judicial functions of the court, including direction over sittings of the court and the assignment of judicial duties.

From 1872 to 1906, the Chief Justice was seated in the Court of Queen’s/King's Bench, which held appellate jurisdiction. The appellate jurisdiction was transferred to the Court of Appeal upon its creation in 1906, and thereafter, the Chief Justice of the Court of Appeal has been the Chief Justice of Manitoba.

Further reading 
 Dale Brawn, "The Court of Queen's Bench of Manitoba 1870-1950:  A Biographical History" (Toronto:  Osgoode Society for Canadian Legal History, 2006)
 Peter McCormick, "Caseload and Output of the Manitoban Court of Appeal:  An Analysis of Twelve Months of Reported Cases" (1990) 19 Man. L. J. 31
 Peter McCormick, "Caseload and Output of the Manitoba Court of Appeal 1989" (1990) 19 Man. L. J. 334
 Peter McCormick, "A Tale of Two Courts:  Appeals from the Manitoba Court of Appeal to the Supreme Court of Canada, 1970-1990" (1990) 19 Man. L. J. 357
 Peter McCormick and Suzanne Maisey, "A Tale of Two Courts II:  Appeals from the Manitoba Court of Appeal to the Supreme Court of Canada, 1906-1990" (1992) 21 Man. L. J. 1
 Peter McCormick, "Caseload and Output of the Manitoba Court of Appeal, 1990" (1992) 21 Man. L. J. 24
 Peter McCormick, "Caseload and Output of the Manitoba Court of Appeal 1991" (1993) 22 Man. L. J. 263
 Peter McCormick, "The Manitoba Court of Appeal, 2000-2004:  Caseload, Output and Citations" (2005) 31 Man. L. J. 1
 Frederick Read, "Early History of the Manitoba Courts", Manitoba Bar News (1937) Vol. 10, Nos. 1 & 2

References

External links
Official webpage
Public database of the court's decisions
Publicly accessible court registry system
Court of Appeal Rules

Manitoba courts
Canadian appellate courts
1906 establishments in Manitoba
Courts and tribunals established in 1906